UFC 65: Bad Intentions was a mixed martial arts competition held by the Ultimate Fighting Championship on November 18, 2006 at the ARCO Arena in Sacramento, California – the UFC’s first show at this venue. It was broadcast live on pay-per-view in the United States and Canada, and was later released on DVD.

Background
The card featured the anticipated rematch between Matt Hughes and Georges St-Pierre for the UFC Welterweight Championship – a fight originally scheduled for UFC 63. UFC 65 also featured a heavyweight title bout between Undisputed UFC Heavyweight Champion Tim Sylvia and Jeff Monson.

This event marked one of the few occasions that a UFC card with two non-interim title fights featured the lower weight class' title fight as the card's main event. The UFC had stated afterwards that all cards with two title fights will always have the heavier weight class' title fight as the main event. UFC 169 on February 1, 2014 would later feature two non-interim title fights, with the lighter weight class as main event.

UFC 65s original slated main event was a championship superfight with UFC Light Heavyweight Champion Chuck Liddell defending his title against PRIDE Middleweight Champion Wanderlei Silva, a matchup UFC President Dana White announced during UFC 61 on July 8, 2006. Since then, the matchup appeared to have been postponed or cancelled because Tito Ortiz had been guaranteed a title shot at UFC 66, which was too close to UFC 65, as White stated in several interviews.

The Hughes vs. St-Pierre main event was long awaited. It was first officially announced to happen at UFC 63 during the July 17, 2006 edition of The Hot List on ESPNEWS. The fight was announced before, without a date, at a press conference in Toronto, Ontario, Canada on April 7, 2006, and the matchup was alluded to—but not officially announced—during the pay-per-view broadcast of UFC 58.

Results

Bonus AwardsFight of the Night: James Irvin vs. Hector RamirezKnockout of the Night: Georges St-PierreSubmission of the Night: Joe Stevenson'

See also
 Ultimate Fighting Championship
 List of UFC champions
 List of UFC events
 2006 in UFC

References

External links
Official UFC website
Official UFC 65 Site
UFC 65 Results on Sherdog.com
Full Listing of UFC 65 Fighter Salaries

Ultimate Fighting Championship events
Events in Sacramento, California
2006 in mixed martial arts
Mixed martial arts in Sacramento, California
Sports competitions in Sacramento, California
2006 in sports in California